India's Master Musician is an album by Hindustani classical musician Ravi Shankar released in March 1959. It was recorded in Hollywood, California. It was later digitally remastered and released in CD format through Angel Records, with digital remastering by Squires Productions.

Supporting musicians are Chatur Lal on tabla and Nodu Mullick on Tamboura.

Track listing
"Kafi-Holi (Spring Festival of Colors)" – 7:13
"Dhun (Folk Airs)" – 5:53
"Mishra Piloo" – 10:37
"Raga Puriya Dhanashri" – 11:22
"Raga Charu Keshi" – 13:29

References

External links
Amazon.com listing

1959 albums
Ravi Shankar albums
Angel Records albums
Albums recorded in India